Wijnands, Wynants and variants are Dutch patronymic surnames, meaning son of Wijnand (also spelled Wijnant, Winand, and, in Afrikaans, Wynand). Among more common variant spellings in the Low Countries are Wijnands (3442 + 108), Wynants (28 + 1985), Wijnants (429 + 1143), Wynant (<5 + 554), Wijnant (38 + 268), and Wijnand (280 + 13). The form Winant is more common in the United States.

Surname
People with these surnames include:

Wijnands 
Ad Wijnands (born 1959), Dutch racing cyclist
 (1945–1993), Dutch botanist

Wijnants 
Jan Wijnants (1632–1684buried 1684), Dutch painter
Jan Wijnants (cyclist) (born 1958), Belgian racing cyclist
Ludwig Wijnants (born 1956), Belgian professional road bicycle racer
Olaf Wijnants (born 1948), Dutch actor
Sarah Wijnants (born 1999), Belgian football forward

Winant 
Carmen Winant (born 1983), American writer and visual artist
Ethel Winant (1922–2003), American casting director and vice-president of CBS
Howard Winant (born 1946), American sociologist and race theorist
John Gilbert Winant (1889–1947), American politician
Scott Winant, American television director and producer
William Winant (born 1953), American percussionist

Winants 
Luc Winants (born 1963), Belgian chess player

Wynand 
Patrecia Wynand, stagename of Patrecia Scott (1940–1977), American model and actress
Paul Wynand (1879–1956), German sculptor and medalist

Wynant 
Adam Wynant (born 1977), American boxer 
H. M. Wynant (born 1927), American film and television actor

Wynants 
Dirk Wynants (born 1964), Flemish furniture designer
Maarten Wynants (born 1982), Belgian racing cyclist
Milton Wynants (born 1972), Uruguayan racing cyclist
Pierre Wynants (born 1939), Belgian chef

Given name 
Winant Sidle (1916–2005), major general in the United States Army
Winant Van Winkle (1879–1943), New Jersey politician

See also
Wynants Kill, a stream in New York named after Wijnant Gerritsen van der Poel (1617–1699)
Wilbur Wynant House, in Indiana
Gail Wynand, character in the novel The Fountainhead 
Wijnen, a Dutch surname of similar origin
Winans (disambiguation), a similar surname

References

Dutch-language surnames
Patronymic surnames

de:Wijnants